Stroești is a commune located in Vâlcea County, Oltenia, Romania. It is composed of five villages: Cireșu, Dianu, Obrocești, Pojogi-Cerna and Stroești.

References

Communes in Vâlcea County
Localities in Oltenia